49er & 49er FX European Championships are annual European Championship sailing regattas in the 49er and the 49er FX classes organised by the International 49er Class Association.

Editions

Medalists

49er

49er FX

References

European championships in sailing
49er competitions
49er FX competitions
Recurring sporting events established in 1997